Saint Petersburg Governorate (Sankt-Peterburgskaya guberniya), or Government of Saint Petersburg, was an administrative division (a guberniya) of the Tsardom of Russia, the Russian Empire, and the Russian SFSR, which existed during 1917–1927.

Establishment

Ingermanland Governorate (Ingermanlandskaya guberniya) was created from the territories reconquered from the Swedish Empire in the Great Northern War. In 1704 prince Alexander Menshikov was appointed as its first governor, and in 1706 it was first Russian region designated as a Governorate. In the same year Ingermanland Governorate was further expanded to encompass the regions of Pskov, Novgorod and other towns of Western Russia. As with the rest of the governorates, neither the borders nor internal subdivisions of Ingermanland Governorate were defined; instead, the territory was defined as a set of cities and the lands adjacent to those cities.

By another edict on June 3, 1710, the governorate was renamed St. Petersburg Governorate after the newly founded city of Saint Petersburg, and in 1721 the former Swedish Duchy of Ingria, and parts of the County of Kexholm and the County of Viborg and Nyslott were formally ceded to Russia by the Treaty of Nystad. After the Treaty of Åbo in 1743, the parts of Kexholm and Viborg were joined with new territorial gains from Sweden into the Governorate of Vyborg.

From August 18, 1914 to January 26, 1924 it was named Petrograd Governorate, and during 1924-1927 — Leningrad Governorate. It was abolished on August 1, 1927 when modern Leningrad Oblast was created.

Administrative divisions 
The governorate was composed of eight counties (uezds) as of January 1, 1914. Follows the table:

Supernumerary town

Former city

Governorate administration

General Governors
Prince Aleksandr Menshikov 12 October 1702 – May 1724
Pyotr Apraksin May 1724 – January 1725
Prince Aleksandr Menshikov January 1725 – 8 September 1727
Jan Sapieha 1727 – 1728
Burkhard Christoph von Münnich January 1728 – 1734 War Governor
Nikolai Golovin 1742
Peter Lacy 1743
Vasily Repnin 1744
Stepan Ignatiev 1744
Boris Yusupov 1749
Prince Mikhail Golitsin 1752 – 1754
Peter August of Schleswig-Holstein-Sonderburg-Beck 1762
Ivan Neplyuyev 1762 – 1764
Ivan Glebov 1767
Prince Aleksander Golitsin October 1769 – 8 October 1783
Jacob Bruce 1784 – 6 October 1791
Aleksander Romanov 6 October 1791 – 1797 War Governor
Nikolai Arkharov 6 October 1791 – November 1796, until 15 June 1797 acting General Governor
Fyodor Buksgevden June 1797 – August 1798
Pyotr von der Pahlen 8 August 1798 – 30 June 1801, until 25 August 1800 acting, from 24 March 1801 War Governor
Mikhail Kutuzov 30 July 1801 – 9 September 1802 War Governor
Mikhail Kamenskiy 27 August 1802 – 16 November 1802 War Governor
Pyotr Tolstoy 28 November 1802 – 25 January 1803 War Governor
Andrey Budberg 25 January 1803 – 17 February 1803 War Governor
Pyotr Tolstoy 28 November 1802 – 10 September 1805 War Governor
Nikolai Svechin 1803 – 1806
Sergey Vyazmitinov 10 September 1805 – 12 January 1808 War Governor
Prince Dmitry Lobanov-Rostovskiy 12 January 1808 – 2 February 1809
Alexander Balashov 14 February 1809 – 9 April 1810
Sergey Vyazmitinov 10 November 1816 – 31 August 1818 War General Governor
Mikhail Miloradovich 31 August 1818 – 15 December 1825 War General Governor
Pavel Golenishchev-Kutuzov 27 December 1825 – 19 February 1830 War General Governor
Pyotr Essen 17 February 1830 – 14 February 1842 War General Governor
Aleksander Kavelin 14 February 1842 – 19 April 1846 War General Governor
Matvey Khrapovitskiy 7 April 1846 – 31 March 1847 War General Governor
Dmitry Shulgin 3 May 1847 – 1 January 1855 War General Governor
Aleksander Stroganov 1854 War Governor
Pavel Ignatiev 28 December 1854 – 16 November 1861 War General Governor
Aleksandr Suvorov-Rymnikskiy 16 November 1861 – 16 May 1866 War General Governor
Iosif Gurko April 1879 – February 1880
Pyotr Gresser February 1880 – 1892
Viktor von Wahl 1892 – 1895
Nikolai Kleigels 1895 – 1904
Ivan Fullon 1904 – 1905
Dmitry Trepov 12 January 1905 – 14 April 1905 acting General Governor
Vladimir Dedyulin 1905 – 1906
Vladimir von der Launits  1906 – 1907
Daniil Drachevsky 1907 – 1914
Aleksandr Obolensky 1914 – 1916
Aleksandr Balk 1916 – March 1917
Vadim Yurevich March – May 1917
Grigory Shreider  July – November 1917

Governors

Marshals of the nobility
Served as chair of the Assembly of Nobility

See also
Administrative divisions of Russia in 1708–1710

References

External links
 List of rulers

 
1708 establishments in Russia
1927 disestablishments in Russia
History of Saint Petersburg
History of Leningrad Oblast
18th century in Saint Petersburg